The Toronto Industry Network (TIN) is a group of manufacturers and manufacturing associations with operations in Toronto, Ontario, Canada. 

According to the organization, Network organizations employ 25,000 people directly and another 100,000 indirectly through suppliers and customers in the Toronto area. Operating since 2001, TIN provides the manufacturing community access to the City of Toronto, participating in the formulation of city policies that affect the industry. TIN is focused on making Toronto more competitive in manufacturing with Canada and foreign countries.

List of members

Company members

 Atlantic Packaging Products Ltd.
 Atlantic Packaging Products Ltd.
 Campbell Company of Canada
 Canadian Fuels
 CBM Readymix
 DEL
 Gay Lee Foods
 Irving Tissue
 K+S Windsor Salt Ltd.
 Lafarge
 Lincoln Electric Company of Canada
 Mondelez Canada
 Owens Corning Insulating Systems Canada LP
 Redpath Sugar
 Sanofi Pasteur
 Siltech Corporation
 The International Group, Inc.

Source: Toronto Industry Network.

Association members
 Canadian Fuels Association
 Leaside Business Park
 South Etobicoke Industrial Employers Association
Source: Toronto Industry Network.

References

External links
 Toronto Industry Network Website
Trade associations based in Ontario
Economy of Toronto